Hylton Ralph Murray-Philipson (12 November 1902 – 24 May 1934) was a Conservative Party politician in the United Kingdom who served as a Member of Parliament (MP) from 1932 to 1934.

He was educated at Eton College. He unsuccessfully contested the 1929 general election  in the Labour-held Scottish constituency of Peebles and Southern.

He next stood for Parliament at the Twickenham by-election on 16 September 1932, following the death of the Conservative MP John Ferguson. He held the seat with a comfortable majority, but died in office in 1934, aged 31.

References

External links 
 

 

1902 births
1934 deaths
People educated at Eton College
Conservative Party (UK) MPs for English constituencies
UK MPs 1931–1935